Allawah is a suburb in southern Sydney, in the state of New South Wales, Australia. Allawah is 16 kilometres south of the Sydney central business district and is part of the St George area. Allawah lies in the local government area of the Georges River Council. The postcode is 2218, which is shared by the neighbouring suburb of Carlton.

History
The name "Allawah" is Aboriginal in origin, from a local term meaning "make your abode here" or "remain here". It is thought that the Aboriginal clan of the Tharawal people most prominent in the St George area, the Gameygal or Kameygal – the people of Kamay (Botany Bay), lived in and around the area.

The grant extended from King Georges Road and Stoney Creek Road (of modern-day Penshurst and Beverly Hills) to beyond Kogarah railway station.

The railway line to Hurstville was opened in 1884, but the railway station at Allawah did not open until 23 October 1925.

The Allawah post office opened in May 1933.

Demographics
The next most common countries of birth were China 21.7%, Nepal 6.9%, Philippines 2.9%, Hong Kong 2.8% and India 2.5%. 27.1% of people only spoke English at home. Other languages spoken at home included Mandarin 18.7%, Cantonese 11.6%, Nepali 7.1%, Arabic 3.7% and Macedonian 2.6%. The most common responses for religious affiliation were No Religion 31.6%, Catholic 17.0% and Hinduism 9.0%.

Commercial area
Allawah is a small landlocked suburb, about 15–20 minutes walking distance from Hurstville. Allawah's main shopping centre is located on Railway Parade, beside Allawah railway station. The Allawah shopping strip contains a newsagent, post office, corner store, Nepalese/Indian grocery store, real estate agency Belle Property Allawah, take-away shops, a hairdresser, and the local pub and bottle shop, the Allawah Hotel. The Allawah Hotel was purchased by Justin Hemmes' Merivale Group in 2019.

Transport
Allawah railway station is on the Illawarra line serviced by Sydney Trains. The railway station has had an upgrade in recent years, including the installation of lifts to benefit the mobility challenged. Trains to Bondi Junction and to Hurstville stop at Allawah six times an hour during peak times, and 4 times an hour at all other times except weekends. Weekends run 2 train services an hour in both directions.

Landmarks
 Allawah Hotel
Little Italy restaurant 
Meade Park
PJ Ferry Reserve Community Hall
 Southern Sydney Synagogue

References

Suburbs of Sydney
Georges River Council